Tang Li may refer to:
 Tang Li (Go player)
 Tang Li (engineer)